Niemeläinen is a Finnish surname. Notable people with the surname include:

Ilmari Niemeläinen (1910–1951), Finnish diver and architect
Markus Niemeläinen (born 1998), Finnish ice hockey player

Finnish-language surnames